Leccinum alboroseolum is a species of bolete fungus in the family Boletaceae. Originally described in 1969 as a variety of Boletus immutabilis, it was transferred to Leccinum in 1994. It is found in Europe.

See also
List of Leccinum species

References

Fungi described in 1970
Fungi of Europe
alboroseolum